Carlos Ernesto Navarro López (born 20 May 1957) is a Mexican politician from the Party of the Democratic Revolution. From 2006 to 2009 he served as Deputy of the LX Legislature of the Mexican Congress representing Sonora.

References

1957 births
Living people
Politicians from Sonora
Party of the Democratic Revolution politicians
20th-century Mexican politicians
21st-century Mexican politicians
Universidad de Sonora alumni
Chapingo Autonomous University alumni
People from Cajeme Municipality
Deputies of the LX Legislature of Mexico
Members of the Chamber of Deputies (Mexico) for Sonora